is a biweekly magazine published in South Korea by Daiwon C.I.  It specializes in serializations of domestic Korean and imported Japanese comics.  Titles serialized in Comic Champ are collected into volumes and published under the Champ Comics imprint.

History
Comic Champ was launched as a weekly magazine on December 5, 1991, under the name Boy Champ (소년챔프).  Its purpose was to compete with Seoul Cultural Publisher's IQ Jump (아이큐점프) for the adolescent and teenage boys market.  It had early success with its serialization of the Japanese basketball series Slam Dunk.  In September 2002, the magazine changed its name to Comic Champ, and in 2006 changed to a biweekly publication schedule.  Today it is published on the first and fifteenth days of each month.

Serializations

The following is a list of series currently running in Comic Champ.

See also 

 List of manga magazines published outside of Japan

References

External links
  

1991 establishments in South Korea
Anime and manga magazines
Biweekly magazines
Magazines established in 1991
Manhwa magazines
Magazines published in South Korea
Weekly magazines